Atreus is a character in Greek mythology.

Atreus can also mean:

 14791 Atreus, an asteroid
 Atreus (God of War), a video game character
 Atreus, a lost play by Lucius Accius
 The Treasury of Atreus, a Bronze Age  tholos tomb at Mycenae

See also
 Atrus, a character in the Myst series of games
 House Atreides, the royal house in Frank Herbert's Dune universe